Ardenheim is an unincorporated community in Henderson Township, Huntingdon County, Pennsylvania about 4 miles east of Huntingdon.  This village is where the Raystown Branch and Frankstown Branch of the Juniata River meet. Ardenheim is located between the boroughs of Huntingdon and Mill Creek.

General information
ZIP Code: 16652
Area Code: 814
Local Phone Exchanges: 641, 643, 644
School District: Huntingdon Area School District

References 

Unincorporated communities in Huntingdon County, Pennsylvania
Unincorporated communities in Pennsylvania